Early to Bed may refer to:

Early to Bed (1928 film), a Laurel and Hardy short
Early to Bed (1933 film), a British-German romantic comedy directed by Ludwig Berger
Early to Bed (1936 film), an American comedy directed by Norman Z. McLeod
Early to Bed (1941 film), an animated short starring Donald Duck
"Early to Bed" (song), a 1917 traditional song